A graduation tower (occasionally referred to as a thorn house) is a structure used in the production of salt which removes water from a saline solution by evaporation, increasing its concentration of mineral salts. The tower consists of a wooden wall-like frame stuffed with bundles of brushwood (typically blackthorn) which have to be changed about every 5 to 10 years as they become encrusted with mineral deposits over time. The salt water runs down the tower and partly evaporates; at the same time some minerals from the solution are left behind on the brushwood twigs.

Graduation towers can be found in a number of spa towns, primarily in Germany but also Poland and Austria. The mineral-rich water droplets in the air are regarded as having beneficial health effects similar to that of breathing in sea air.

A large complex of graduation towers is located in Ciechocinek and Inowrocław, Poland. This entirely wooden construction in Ciechocinek was erected in the 19th century by Stanisław Staszic. The complex consists of three graduation towers with a total length of over 2 km. Many tourists visit it for health reasons.

Gallery

Partial list of towns and cities with graduation towers

With years of initial construction where available. Does not include modern indoor facilities found  in some spas.

France
 Saulnot (16th century)
 Arc-et-Senans (1775)

Germany
Bad Dürkheim (1736)
Bad Dürrenberg
Bad Essen
Bad Karlshafen (1986)
Bad Kissingen (16th   century)
Bad Kreuznach (1732)
Bad Kösen
Bad Münster am Stein (1729)
Bad Nauheim
Bad Oeynhausen
Bad Orb (1806)
Bad Rappenau (2008)
Bad Reichenhall (1911)
Bad Rothenfelde (1777)
Bad Salzelmen (part of Schönebeck, 1756)
Bad Salzhausen (around 1600)
Bad Salzuflen (18th century)
Bad Salzungen
Bad Sassendorf
Bad Soden (part of Bad Soden-Salmünster, 2006)
Bad Sooden-Allendorf
Bad Staffelstein
Eibach (part of Dillenburg, 2004)
Hamm (2008)
Lüneburg (1907)
Rheine (Saline Gottesgabe) 
Salzgitter-Bad (2009)
Salzkotten

Poland
Busko-Zdrój (since 2022)
Ciechocinek (three towers: 1824 to 1859)
Chorzów
Gliwice
Gołdap (since 2014)
Grudziądz (since 2006)
Inowrocław (since 2001)
Katowice (since 2018)
Konstancin-Jeziorna (since 1978)
Kraków (two towers: in Nowa Huta and Bagry districts, since 2021)
Latoszyn
Radlin (since 2014)
Rabka-Zdrój
Rymanów-Zdrój
Ustka (since July 2020)
Wieliczka (since 2014) 
 
Romania
Baile Figa (2020)

References

External links



Mining equipment
Salt production